Michael David Martin Sr. (born February 12, 1944) is the former head baseball coach of the Florida State Seminoles baseball team.  Martin is the all-time winningest coach in NCAA Division I college baseball.  Upon the completion of his career, Martin had compiled a record of 2,029 wins, 736 losses and four ties over 40 seasons of collegiate coaching. On May 5, 2018, Martin reached 1,976 career wins, surpassing legendary coach Augie Garrido.

Martin, a native of Charlotte, North Carolina, began his collegiate playing career at Wingate Junior College where he was a Junior College All-American.  He then transferred to Florida State, where he played from 1965 to 1966 and graduated in 1966.  During his years as the center fielder at Florida State, Martin hit .354, and earned all-District honors in his senior season and played in the 1965 College World Series.  After his college career was over, Martin played professional baseball in the New York Mets and Detroit Tigers minor league organizations for three seasons before beginning his career in coaching.

Martin began his career in coaching at the junior high school level. His first stint as a college coach, surprisingly, came in a different sport, basketball, when Martin became the head basketball coach at Tallahassee Community College during the 1970–1971 season.

It was in 1975, when Woody Woodward took over the head coaching job at Florida State, that Martin would be reunited with his alma mater.  Martin served as an assistant coach under Woodward for four seasons, and then for another season under Dick Howser.  Howser would get his chance to manage the New York Yankees and Martin stepped into the head coaching role at Florida State in 1980.

Though Martin's teams did not win a national title, his tenure at Florida State was marked with many honors and feats. Florida State, as of the 2019 season, has made 43 straight postseason appearances (41 under Martin), the longest active streak in the country. Martin's Seminoles won eight Atlantic Coast Conference tournament championships and appeared in 17 College World Series.

Martin's players, which include many college and professional standouts such as Deion Sanders, J. D. Drew, Doug Mientkiewicz, Stephen Drew, Paul Wilson, Lincoln R. "Link" Jarrett, and Buster Posey, have excelled as well. More than 70 of Martin's players have been named All-Americans, five have been named national player of the year, four have won the Golden Spikes Award, considered to be the most prestigious individual award in amateur baseball, and two - J.D. Drew and Posey - have won the Dick Howser Trophy, considered to be the equivalent of the Heisman Trophy for baseball. Martin has won the ACC Coach of the Year award seven times (1996, 1998, 1999, 2001, 2007, 2009, 2012).

On June 18, 2018, it was announced that Martin would retire following the 2019 season.

Florida State's baseball team plays on Mike Martin Field at Dick Howser Stadium, dedicated in 2005.

On March 9, 2019, Martin became the first coach to achieve 2,000 career wins with a 5–2 victory over Virginia Tech in the second game of a doubleheader. In 2019, Martin was inducted into the National College Baseball Hall of Fame.

Head coaching record

See also
 List of college baseball coaches with 1,100 wins

References

External links
 Florida State profile

1944 births
Living people
Florida State Seminoles baseball coaches
Florida State Seminoles baseball players
Greenville Mets players
Winter Haven Mets players
Wingate Bulldogs baseball players
Mankato Mets players
Rocky Mount Leafs players
People from Gastonia, North Carolina
Baseball coaches from North Carolina
Junior college men's basketball coaches in the United States
National College Baseball Hall of Fame inductees